Güzel (English: Beautiful) is the eleventh studio album by Turkish pop music singer, Yıldız Tilbe. The album includes 16 songs. Lyrics and musics are by Yıldız Tilbe. The album was released in 2008.

Track listing 
 Seni Hâlâ Bekliyorum – (I Still Have Been Waiting For You)
 Git Gör Gününü – (Go See Your Day)
 Ayıp Değil Mi Canım – (Is It Not Shame Sweethearth)
 Dünden Bugüne – (From Yesterday To Today)
 Ben Masumum – (I Am Innocent)
 Güzel – (Beautiful)
 Erkeğimsin (Kıskançlık Sendromu) – (You Are My Boy / Jealousy Syndrome)
 Nazlı Yarim – (My Coy Beloved)
 Aşk Bir Kahkaha – (Love Is A Laugh)
 Ben Senin Var Ya – (I Have About You)
 Aşk Bağlanmaz Ki – (Love Do Not Attach)
 Çöpteyim – (I Am Garbage)
 Seni Anlattım Aşka – (I Told You to the Love)
 Kara Güneş – (Black Sun)
 Şarkıların Şarkısı – (The Song of Songs)
 Ben Olaydım – (If I Was to the Point)

References

2008 albums
Yıldız Tilbe albums